Tuna Port is a port town in Anjar taluka of Kutch district of Gujarat, India.

History
Tuna Port was developed during mid-eighteenth century. 

Fateh Mohammad (1786–1813), a shepherd-turned-king, had further developed the existing facilities at Mandvi, Tuna and Lakhpat ports, when he was appointed as regent during reign of Rao Raydhanji III of Kutch. There is a village by same name Tuna near the port from which Tuna Port got its name.

In year 1900-01 during the reign of Jadeja King Maharao Shri Khengarji Bawa (1875–1942), the first railway lines from Tuna Port to Anjar were laid by narrow gauge line of Cutch State Railway,a railway promoted & owned by the Princely State of Cutch. The first train from Tuna Port to Anjar ran in year 1905. The line was in 1908 extended to Bhuj, then the Capital of the Princely State of Cutch. This rail-line from Tuna to Anjar, no longer exists. However, there are plans to again revive the railway link again.

Later, during decade of 1930, Tuna Port lost its importance, when 
Maharao Shri Khengarji III of Kutch, identified the location of present the Kandla Port and developed it as a new port. A new railway line connecting Anjar to Kandla were also laid by Cutch State Railway.

After the partition and independence of India and merger of Cutch into Union of India in 1947, in 1950 Kandla Port was selected by the Government of India  to be developed as major port to replace the loss of Karachi, which went to Pakistan. The Kandla Railway Station was later renamed Gandhidham  after the new town of same name was developed for the re-settlement of Sindhi refugees, who migrated from Pakistan upon Partition.

Present day
Tuna Port is operated by the Kandla Port Trust. The Trust decided to develop Tuna as satellite port in Kutch as to compete with nearby privately owned Mundra Port operated by Adani Group. This is the second port after Vadinar Port to be developed by Kandla Port Trust.

Connectivity
The nearest Airport is Kandla Airport and Rail-head is Gandhidham.

References
 
 Location of Tuna Port on Wikimap

Cities and towns in Kutch district
Ports and harbours of Gujarat
History of Kutch
Tourist attractions in Kutch district